The following lists events that happened during 1885 in Chile.

Incumbents
President of Chile: Domingo Santa María

Events

June
5 June - The Academia Chilena de la Lengua is founded.

October
22 October - The Independent Liberal Party (Chile) is established.

Deaths
date unknown - José Zapiola (born 1802)

References 

 
Years of the 19th century in Chile
Chile